Booker Little 4 and Max Roach (also released as The Defiant Ones) is an album by American jazz trumpeter Booker Little featuring performances recorded in 1958 (and 1959 on the CD reissue) for the United Artists label.

Reception
The AllMusic review by Scott Yanow stated: "Overall, this forward-looking hard bop set is easily recommended".

Track listing
All compositions by Booker Little except as indicated
 "Milestones" (John Lewis) – 5:33 
 "Sweet and Lovely" (Gus Arnheim, Jules LeMare, Harry Tobias) – 4:13 
 "Rounder's Mood" – 5:19 
 "Dungeon Waltz" – 4:27 
 "Jewel's Tempo" – 6:35 
 "Moonlight Becomes You" (Johnny Burke, Jimmy Van Heusen) – 5:40 
 "Things Ain't What They Used to Be" (Mercer Ellington) – 10:44 
 "Blue 'n' Boogie" (Dizzy Gillespie, Frank Paparelli) – 8:09
Recorded in New York City in October 1958 (at Nola Penthouse Studios, #1–6) and January 30, 1959 (#7–8, some sources suggest Olmsted Sound Studios, NYC, April 15, 1959).

Personnel
On #1–6
Booker Little – trumpet
George Coleman – tenor saxophone
Tommy Flanagan – piano
Art Davis – bass
Max Roach – drums
Originally released as United Artists UAL4034 (mono)/UAS5034 (stereo).

On #7–8 (1991 Blue Note CD reissue only)
Booker Little, Louis Smith – trumpets
Frank Strozier – alto saxophone
George Coleman – tenor saxophone
Phineas Newborn – piano
Calvin Newborn – guitar
George Joyner – bass
Charles Crosby – drums
Originally released as by Young Men From Memphis on Down Home Reunion, United Artists UAL4029 (mono)/UAS5029 (stereo).

References

United Artists Records albums
Booker Little albums
1958 debut albums